Zelada is a Spanish surname. Notable people with the surname include:

Francesco Saverio de Zelada (1717-1801) Italian Roman Catholic Cardinal
Héctor Zelada (born 1957), Argentine footballer
Juan Zelada (born 1981), Spanish musician
Leo Zelada (born 1970), Peruvian writer